Musée Mécanique is an American band based in Portland, Oregon, fronted by singer-songwriters Micah Rabwin and Sean Ogilvie. The band's debut LP Hold This Ghost was released September 30, 2008 on Frog Stand Records of Brooklyn, New York and in 2010 on Souterrain Transmissions  of Berlin, Germany. The 2014 album From the Shores of Sleep was released  by the Portland indie label Tender Loving Empire and in Europe by Glitterhouse Records.

History
The band's chief songwriters, Micah Rabwin and Sean Ogilvie, have been writing and performing music together since childhood. Ogilvie used to be with San Diego, California post-rock band Tristeza. Musée Mécanique was founded in 2006 with the addition of Matt Berger, Jeff Boyd and Brian Perez.

Hold This Ghost
The album was largely celebrated as an inventive addition to the indie folk scene. It was roundly praised, described as a successful and "delicate take on folk, meticulously arranged" by XLR8R. Pitchfork gave it 7.2 points, noting its "elegant clarity and regal sadness".
Musée Mécanique toured extensively in support of Hold This Ghost, including multiple tours in both the United States and Europe. They shared the stage with widely celebrated folk acts such as Iron & Wine, Beach House and M Ward, and garnered critical comparisons to other important folk bands, such as Neutral Milk Hotel and Beirut.

The album was produced and engineered by Rabwin and Ogilvie and mixed by Tucker Martine, who has worked with The Decemberists, Sufjan Stevens and Laura Veirs. The song "Like Home" was featured on the internationally syndicated NPR show All Songs Considered on November 17, 2008.

 
Track listing:
 Like Home
 Two Friends Like Us
 The Propellors
 The Things That I Know
 Fits and Starts
 Somehow Bound
 Under Glass
 Sleeping in Our Clothes
 Nothing Glorious
 Our Changing Skins

From Shores of Sleep 
In August 2014, the band released their second album From Shores of Sleep. The ten-song album was recorded by the band at their Wooden Fences Studio and it was released by the Portland, Oregon-based imprint Tender Loving Empire. The album was mixed and mastered by Tony Lash. As of October 2014, an instrumental version of the album is available as a digital download.

Track Listing:
 O. Astoria
 The Lighthouse and the Hourglass
 The Open Sea
 The Man Who Sleeps
 A Wish We Spoke
 Castle Walls
 The World of Silence
 Along the Shore
 Cast in the Brine
 The Shaker's Cask

References

External links

Official Band Website

Musical groups from Portland, Oregon
2006 establishments in Oregon
Musical groups established in 2006
Glitterhouse Records artists